The Kara Mustafa Paşa Mosque or Paşa Mosque is an historic mosque which situated in county central of Merzifon. It is the one of greatest mosque of the county which is still using as mosque.

History

It was built in 1666 by Merzifonlu Kara Mustafa Paşa period of Ottoman Sultan Mehmed IV.

Architecture

The Paşa Mosque has one main dome, one minaret and four secondary domes in corners. Main worship area of Mosque under main dome. Mosque have three series windows which illume by it.

Galery

See also
 List of mosques
 Mosques commissioned by the Ottoman dynasty
 Ottoman architecture

References

Buildings and structures in Amasya Province
Merzifon District
Religious buildings and structures completed in 1666
Ottoman mosques in Turkey
1666 establishments in the Ottoman Empire